Yarn is a music group formed in Brooklyn, New York in 2006, now based in North Carolina. The group is led by songwriter Blake Christiana on vocals and guitar, Rod Hohl on electric guitar, Rick Bugel on bass, and Robert Bonhomme on drums. 

By playing up to 170 dates a year. they have ¨earned¨ a reputation as a hard-working live act." "They have landed on the Grammy ballot 4 times, garnered nods from the Americana Music Association, placed top five on both Radio and Records and the AMA album charts, garnered airplay on Sirius FM, iTunes, Pandora, CNN, and CMT, and also accorded the “Download of the Day” from Rolling Stone.". Their latest project "Lucky 13" involves releasing new singles, with and "A" and "B" side, on the 13th of each month, charging $5 for an entire year's worth of music.

Blake’s wife is singer-songwriter, Mandy Christiana. Together, they share a daughter, Lillian Garth.

Band Members
 Blake Christiana - vocals, acoustic guitar
 Rod Hohl - guitars, vocals
 Rick Bugel - bass 
 Robert Bonhomme - drums

References

External links

2006 establishments in New York City
Musical groups from Brooklyn
Musical groups established in 2006
Musical groups from North Carolina